The 2022 UK & Ireland Greyhound Racing Year was the 97th year of greyhound racing in the United Kingdom and Ireland.

Summary
The year started well for the industry when Kevin Boothby's Suffolk Downs was granted a Greyhound Board of Great Britain (GBGB) licence. The first trial session took place on 12 January and the first meeting was held on 8 February 2022, with the primary race distance being 388 metres.

A parliamentary debate took place on the 28 March discussing a petition presented by Welsh Labour MP Christina Rees to abolish greyhound racing in Wales. The anonymous petitioner referred largely to the Valley Greyhound Stadium (not affiliated to the GBGB) and a stray and abandoned dogs centre called Hope Rescue (both in Wales). Parliament voted for no further action.

Mark Wallis won his fourth Trainers Championship (marketed as Judgement Night), which was held at Monmore Green. He would go on to win the Greyhound Trainer of the Year for a 13th time.

The major open race circuit saw a significant increment in prize money levels. Premier Greyhound Racing (the collaboration between the Arena Racing Company and Entain increased the winning prize of two original classics, the St Leger and Oaks to £20,000. Additionally, the Golden Jacket, Champion Stakes, Regency and Eclipse also offered a £20,000 first prize. Towcester continued to hold events with a £10,000 winner's prize. The addition of the new category 1 competitions resulted in the GBGB changing the rules in relation to the number of rounds held. The new ruling (from 2023) would see category 1 events, except the classics, held over three rounds instead of four.

The industry was split on the new GBGB rule that stated a greyhound not to run more than once in a four day period (this included trials). This upset many of the leading figures within the industry who argued that trainers were in the best position to establish when a greyhound should race or trial. The rule was seen by some as an appeasement to welfare groups but others argued that it was a way to eliminate any excessive racing demands of a greyhound.

Oxford Stadium reopened after a ten year absence, the track saw a capacity attendance for the meeting held on 2 September. The reopening of one of the sports most popular tracks was another boost for the industry. Just ten days later at the track, during the sales trials on 13 September the British sales record for a greyhound was broken when Drumcrow Mini was sold for £16,300. However, Oxford still remained in the ownership of a property developer and was only operated on a lease.

Roll of honour

Competitions

United Kingdom
The St Leger champion Space Jet continued her fine form from 2021, when winning the prestigious Coral TV Trophy at Brighton in April. Coolavanny Aunty claimed a significant double when winning the Essex Vase and Grand Prix, as did Signet Denver who took the Laurels and Produce Stakes.

Ireland
The 2021 Irish Greyhound Derby champion Susie Sapphire impressed again when winning the Easter Cup, she started at odds of 1/3 for the final (the shortest price in the modern era).

Principal UK finals

Principal Irish finals

UK Category 1 & 2 competitions

+ delayed and then cancelled

Irish feature competitions

References 

Greyhound racing in the United Kingdom
Greyhound racing in the Republic of Ireland
UK and Ireland Greyhound Racing Year
UK and Ireland Greyhound Racing Year
2022 in greyhound racing